Admiral Constant Louis Jean Benjamin Jaurès (3 February 1823 – 13 March 1889) was a French Navy officer and politician. Born in Albi, Tarn, he was a senator for life and active in Japan during the 1863 Shimonoseki campaign and the Boshin War. He became Minister of the Navy and Colonies on 22 February 1889, in the government of Pierre Tirard. The famous French politician, Jean Jaurès, was his nephew.

See also

 List of naval ministers of France

References

1823 births
1889 deaths
People from Albi
French republicans
Ministers of Marine and the Colonies
Members of the National Assembly (1871)
French life senators
Ambassadors of France to the Russian Empire
French Navy admirals
19th-century diplomats